The Central District of Buin Zahra County is a district (bakhsh) in Buin Zahra County, Qazvin Province, Iran. At the 2006 census, its population was 89,204, in 21,632 families.  The District has two cities: Buin Zahra and Sagezabad.   The District has three rural districts (dehestan): Sagezabad Rural District, Zahray-ye Bala Rural District, and Zahray-ye Pain Rural District.

References 

Districts of Qazvin Province
Buin Zahra County